Jolaibari railway station  is a railway station in South Tripura district, Tripura. Its code is JLBRI. It serves Jolaibari village. The station lies on the Agartala–Sabroom rail section, which comes under the Lumding railway division of the Northeast Frontier Railway. The segment from Agartala to Sabroom via Udaipur became operational on  3 October 2019.

References

Railway stations in South Tripura district
Lumding railway division
Proposed railway stations in India